Francisco Rúa (born in Buenos Aires, Argentina, 4 February 1911, died on 5 August 1993) was an Argentine football forward who played for Argentina in the 1934 FIFA World Cup. 
He also played for Talleres de Remedios de Escalada, Lanús, Dock Sud, Vélez Sarsfield, Newell's Old Boys, Estudiantes (BA) and Temperley.

References

External links
FIFA profile

1911 births
1993 deaths
Argentine footballers
Argentina international footballers
Talleres de Remedios de Escalada footballers
Association football forwards
Sportivo Dock Sud players
1934 FIFA World Cup players
Footballers from Buenos Aires